= Wagro =

2022 Indian Konkani-language short film

Wagro is a Konkani language short film from Goa. The film was screened at 2022 Cannes Film Festival's Short Film Corner. Wagro, meaning "place of sacrifice", was directed by Sainath Uskaikar and produced by Rajesh Pednekar. Wagro received seven awards at the 60 Hours Filmmaking Challenge.
